Acanthodus is an extinct genus of conodonts.

Acanthodus humachensis and A. raqueli are from then Late Cambrian (late Furongian) or early Ordovician (Tremadocian) of the Santa Rosita Formation in Argentina.

References

External links 

 
 

Conodont genera
Cambrian conodonts
Ordovician conodonts
Furongian first appearances
Early Ordovician extinctions
Tremadocian

Cambrian genus extinctions
Ordovician genus extinctions